Budd House may refer to:

Glover House (Newtown, Connecticut), known also as Budd House, NRHP-listed in Fairfield County
Prof. J.L. Budd, Sarah M., and Etta Budd House, Ames, Iowa, listed on the NRHP in Story County, Iowa
Charles H. Budd House, Montevideo, Minnesota, listed on the NRHP in Minnesota